These are the references for further information regarding the Sangh Parivar.

Secondary sources

RSS
 
 
 
 
 
 Malkani, K. R. (1980). The RSS story. New Delhi: Impex India.

RSS, Jana Sangh & BJP
 
 
 Elst, Koenraad 
 Elst, Koenraad 
 Jain, Girilal (1996). The Hindu phenomenon. New Delhi [u.a.: UBSPD.
 Heuzé, G. (1994). Où va l'Inde moderne?. Paris: Harmattan.
 
 
 
 Arun Shourie, Goel, Sita Ram, et al. Freedom of expression – Secular Theocracy Versus Liberal Democracy (1998)

Jana Sangh

BJP
 
Elst, Koenraad 
 
 
 Madhu Kishwar. Modi, Muslims and Media: Voices from Narendra Modi's Gujarat (Manushi Publications, 2014). .

VHP

Sangh Parivar
 
  
 Arun Shourie, Goel, Sita Ram, et al. Time for Stock-Taking - Whither Sangh Parivar? (1997)

Primary sources

RSS
Golwalkar, M. S. (2000). Bunch of thoughts. Bangalore: Sahitya Sindhu Prakashana.

BJP
 Lal Krishna Advani. My Country My Life. (2008). .
Bharatiya Janata Party. (1993). BJP's white paper on Ayodhya & the Rama Temple movement. New Delhi: Bhaatiya Janata Party.
Bharatiya Janata Party. (1984). Action unavoidable situation avoidable: Hindu-Sikh unity at all cost : B.J.P. on Punjab. New Delhi: Bharatiya Janata Party Publication.

RSS, Jana Sangh & BJP
Arun Shourie, Arun Jaitley, Swapan Dasgupta, Rama J Jois: The Ayodhya Reference: Supreme Court Judgement and Commentaries. 1995. New Delhi:Voice of India.  
Vishwa Hindu Parishad, History versus Casuistry: Evidence of the Ramajanmabhoomi Mandir presented by the Vishwa Hindu Parishad to the Government of India in December–January 1990–91. (1991)

See also
Bibliography of the history of the Republican Party

Hindu nationalism
Sangh Parivar